Old Goa is a historical site and city situated on the southern banks of the River Mandovi, within the Tiswadi taluka (Ilhas) of North Goa district, in the Indian state of Goa.

The city was established by the Bijapur Sultanate in the 15th century AD. After the Portuguese conquest of Goa, it served as capital of Portuguese Indian possessions, such as Mumbai/Bombay (Bom Bahia) territory and the state of Kochi/Cochin (Cochim), until its abandonment in the 18th century AD due to a plague. Under Portuguese rule, it is said to have been a city of nearly 200,000 people, from whence the spice trade was carried out across the Portuguese East Indies. The deserted city has been declared a World Heritage Site by the UNESCO.

Etymology

The name "Old Goa" was first used in the 1960s in the address of the Konkani monthly magazine, dedicated to spread the devotion of the Sacred Heart, Dor Mhoineachi Rotti, which was shifted to the Basilica of Bom Jesus in 1964. Postal letters were returned to the sender, as the name "Old Goa" was unknown then, according to then- and long-time editor of the monthly, the great Goan historian late Padre Moreno de Souza, SJ.

The village panchayat uses the name Sé-Old Goa, while the post office and the Archaeological Survey of India use the name Velha Goa.

The place is known as Saibachem Gõy (referring to St Francis Xavier as saib, i.e., master), Pornnem Gõy, Adlem Gõy or just Gõy in Konkani.

"Velha Goa" should not be confused with another former Goan capital, Goa Velha, lying some villages away in the south. The names Vhoddlem Gõy and Thorlem Gõy refer to Goa Velha, while Gõy, besides referring to "Velha Goa"—i.e., Old Goa—also refers to the whole state of Goa in some contexts (Old Goa).

History
The city was founded in the 15th century as a port on the banks of the Mandovi river by the rulers of the Bijapur Sultanate. It was built to replace Govapuri, which lay a few kilometres to the south and had been used as a port by the Kadamba and Vijayanagar kings. Old Goa was the second capital after Bijapur of the rule of Adil Shahi Dynasty. It was surrounded by a moat and contained the shah's palace, mosques, and temples. The city was captured by the Portuguese and was under Portuguese rule from 1510 as the administrative seat of Portuguese India.

The viceroy's residence was transferred in 1759 to the future capital, Panjim (a village about 9 kilometres to its west). Few remnants, if any, of the pre-Portuguese period remain at Old Goa.

During the mid-16th century, the Portuguese colony of Goa, especially Velha Goa, was the center of Christianisation in the East. The city was evangelized by all religious orders, since all of them had their headquarters there. The population was roughly 200,000 by 1543. Malaria and cholera epidemics ravaged the city in the 17th century and it was largely abandoned, only having a remaining population of 1,500 in 1775. It was then that the viceroy moved to Panjim. It continued to be the de jure capital of Goa until 1843, when the capital was shifted to Panjim (Ponnjê in Konkani, Nova Goa in Portuguese and Panaji in Hindi). The abandoned city came to be known as "Velha Goa" (in Portuguese, 'Old Goa'), to distinguish it from the new capital Nova Goa (Panjim) and probably also Goa Velha (also meaning "Old Goa"), which was the Portuguese name for the town on the old site of Govapuri.

Velha Goa was incorporated into the Republic of India after its annexation in 1961, with the rest of Goa. It retains its religious significance in modern-day Goa, notably in its relations with Roman Catholicism. The Archbishop of Goa and Daman holds title as the Patriarch of the East Indies. Unlike the patriarchs and the major archbishops of the Eastern Catholic Churches, the Patriarch of the East Indies only enjoys honorary title and is fully subject to the Pope. He has a place in the Latin Church similar to the Patriarchs of Venice and Lisbon. This title was conferred upon the Archbishop of Goa as part of a settlement between the Holy See and the Portuguese government concerning the link between religious and political aspects of its territories.

Churches of Old Goa
Old Goa contains churches including the Se Cathedral (the seat of the Archbishop of Goa), the Church and Convent of St. Francis of Assisi, the Chapel of Our Lady of the Mount, the Church of St. Caetano and, notably, the Basilica of Bom Jesus which contains the relics of Saint Francis Xavier, who is celebrated every year on 3 December with novenas beginning on 24 November.

Gallery

Location

See also

Church of St. Anne, Talaulim
Fort Bassein
Goa
Damaon
Velhas Conquistas
Portuguese India
Cumbarjua

Notes

References

.

External links
History of Old Goa (archived)
Old Goa – India tourism

 
Colonial Goa
History of Goa
Cities and towns in North Goa district
World Heritage Sites in India